This is a list of state prisons in Tennessee. The only federal prison in Tennessee is Federal Correctional Institution, Memphis in Shelby County, although there is a Residential Reentry Management operated by the Bureau of Prisons in Nashville. This list also does not include county jails located in the state of Tennessee.

The Tennessee government agency responsible for state prisons is the Tennessee Department of Correction.

Male facilities

Female facilities

Private facilities

Closed

External links
 Official Website Tennessee Department of Corrections

Notes

References

 
Tennessee
Prisons